The 1998 Estonian Figure Skating Championships were held in Tallinn from March 13 to 15, 1998. Skaters competed in the disciplines of men's singles, ladies' singles, pair skating, and ice dancing on the senior and junior levels.

Senior results

Men

Ladies

Pairs

 WD = Withdrawn

Ice dancing

Junior results
The 1998 Estonian Junior Figure Skating Championships took place in Tallinn from February 21 through 22, 1998.

Men

Ladies
10 participants

Ice dancing
4 participants

References

Figure Skating Championships
Estonian Figure Skating Championships, 1998
Estonian Figure Skating Championships